Sarah Jane Cooper née Sarah Robinson (born 1949) is a female British former sports shooter.

Sports shooting career
Cooper competed in the 1984 Summer Olympics and 1988 Summer Olympics.

She represented England and won a gold medal in the 50 metres Rifle three position pair with her husband Malcolm Cooper, at the 1986 Commonwealth Games in Edinburgh, Scotland.

Personal life
She married Malcolm Cooper in 1974.

References

1949 births
Living people
British female sport shooters
Olympic shooters of Great Britain
Shooters at the 1984 Summer Olympics
Shooters at the 1988 Summer Olympics
Shooters at the 1986 Commonwealth Games
Commonwealth Games medallists in shooting
Commonwealth Games gold medallists for England
20th-century British women
European champions in shooting
Medallists at the 1986 Commonwealth Games